James R. French is a prominent U.S. aerospace engineer. While working for different NASA contractors during the 1960s, he helped design, develop and test the rocket engines for the Apollo/Saturn launch vehicles and the Apollo Lunar Module that enabled humans to walk on the Moon. He then joined NASA's Jet Propulsion Laboratory (JPL) where he worked on the Mariner, Viking, and Voyager missions.

French is a long-time advocate of a mission architecture for a Mars probe, known as Mars Sample Return with In-Situ Propellant Production, that would manufacture propellant from resources at the target planet to power a return trip, to dramatically reduce the size of the outbound vessel and the cost of the mission. He also published an article in the Journal of the British Interplanetary Society in 1989, recommending in-situ propellant production for a crewed Mars mission, though he recommended that the technique would not be feasible until a Mars base was already well-established, due to the risks of relying on fueling a spacecraft with in-situ produced propellant. Robert Zubrin credits this paper as a forerunner of the Mars Direct mission architecture, in which French's concern is resolved by devoting a separate spacecraft to the return trip, so that it can be verified as fueled and ready to launch from Mars before the crew launches from Earth.

French now works as a private space systems engineering consultant, and is a Fellow of the American Institute of Aeronautics and Astronautics (AIAA). He has co-authored the book Space Vehicle Design with Michael Griffin, who was the chief of NASA until January 20, 2009.

French is currently a director and engineering chief for the Golden Spike Company, which is planning commercial missions to the moon.

References

American aerospace engineers
Living people
Year of birth missing (living people)